William J. Lewis (July 4, 1766 – November 1, 1828) was a U.S. Representative from Virginia.

Born in Augusta County, Virginia, Lewis attended the common schools.
He served as member of the State house of delegates.

Lewis was elected as a Democratic-Republican to the Fifteenth Congress (March 4, 1817 – March 3, 1819).
He died at "Mount Athos" plantation, near Lynchburg, Virginia, November 1, 1828.
He was interred in a vault blasted out of a solid rock at the summit of "Mount Athos," Virginia.

Mount Athos was destroyed by fire in 1876, and was listed on the National Register of Historic Places in 1975 as an archaeological site.

References

1766 births
1828 deaths
Democratic-Republican Party members of the United States House of Representatives from Virginia